Laura Mackenzie Phillips (born November 10, 1959) is an American actress and singer, known for her roles as Carol Morrison in the film American Graffiti, as teenager Julie Mora Cooper Horvath on the sitcom One Day at a Time, and as Molly Phillips on the Disney Channel supernatural series So Weird.

Early life 
Born in Alexandria, Virginia, she is the daughter of John Phillips, singer in The Mamas & the Papas, and his first wife, Susan Stuart Adams. She is the sister of Jeffrey Phillips and a half-sister of Tamerlane Phillips, actress Bijou Phillips, and singer Chynna Phillips.

Phillips attended Highland Hall Waldorf School in Northridge, California. At age 12, Phillips formed a band with three of her classmates and was spotted by a casting agent during one of their performances. She was given an audition for a role in the 1973 film American Graffiti, which she won.

Career 
Phillips was 12 years old during the filming of American Graffiti, and 13 when the movie was released. She was cast as Carol Morrison, a young girl accidentally picked up by hot rodding teenager John Milner (Paul Le Mat). Because of California state law, producer Gary Kurtz became Phillips's legal guardian for the duration of the filming.

Phillips gained stardom in the 1970s playing teenager Julie Cooper (when the character got married, her married name was Horvath) on the long-running television show One Day at a Time, for which she earned $50,000 (equal to $ today) a week. During the show's third season in 1977, Phillips was arrested for disorderly conduct. Because of her drug and alcohol abuse, Phillips began arriving late and was even incoherent for rehearsals. The producers ordered her to take a six-week break to overcome her addiction but were ultimately forced to fire her in 1980.

After two near-fatal overdoses, Phillips entered Fair Oaks Hospital voluntarily for treatment. In 1981, the producers of One Day at a Time invited her back to the show. However, in 1982, Phillips relapsed into cocaine use and the following year, she collapsed on the show's set. After refusing to take a drug test, she was fired permanently, and her character was written out of the series. In 1992, Philips entered a drug rehab program for nine months.

From the mid 1980s to the early 1990s, Phillips performed as a singer and toured with a re-formed version of The Mamas & the Papas, known as The New Mamas and The Papas.

In 1999, Phillips co-starred with Cara DeLizia in the Disney Channel series So Weird, playing a fictional rock star named Molly Phillips. She sang original songs written by show producers Jon Cooksey and Ann Marie Montade. In 2002, she appeared in the Disney Channel original movie Double Teamed. Phillips guest-starred on episodes of ER, Without a Trace, 7th Heaven, Cold Case, and Beverly Hills, 90210.

Phillips won an Honorary Best Actress award on March 20, 2011, at the closing night awards gala of the Female Eye Film Festival in Toronto, Ontario, Canada, for her performance as Sharon in the 2010 independent film Peach Plum Pear. While in Toronto, she was interviewed on Canada AM, ET Canada, and The Marilyn Denis Show.

In 2016, Phillips began working at the Breathe Life Healing Center in West Hollywood, California as a drug rehab counselor.

In 2017, Phillips appeared in an episode of the rebooted One Day at a Time as Pam Valentine. The role was apt, given Phillips's history: she portrayed a counselor. She reprised the role in 2019, in two episodes of the third season.

In 2018, Phillips appeared as Barbara Denning in multiple episodes of Netflix original Orange Is the New Black.

Personal life
Phillips has been married three times: first to rock group manager Jeffrey Sessler, son of Freddie Sessler (from 1979 to 1981); then to rock guitarist Shane Fontayne (from 1986 to 2000), and to Keith Levenson in 2005, and later divorced. Levenson remarried in 2007. She has one child, son Shane Barakan (born 1987), a musician. In an interview in March 2022, she stated that she has dated both men and women.

Substance abuse and arrest
Phillips has had a lifetime troubled by drug abuse. On August 27, 2008, she was arrested by the Los Angeles Airport Police on charges of possession of cocaine and heroin after she went through airport security screening. On October 31, 2008, she pleaded guilty to one felony count of cocaine possession, and was sentenced to a drug rehabilitation program. Phillips's drug case was dismissed after she successfully completed a drug diversion program.

She appeared on the third season of Celebrity Rehab, which aired in January and February 2010. She later discussed her recovery on the March 17, 2010, episode of The View.

Relationship with father
In September 2009, Phillips's memoir High on Arrival was released, after which she appeared on The Oprah Winfrey Show for an hour-long interview. She told Winfrey that she first tried cocaine when she was 11 years old, and that her father had taken drugs with her, and had also injected her with cocaine. During the interview, Phillips read excerpts from her book. She said that at the age of 19, on the night before her first wedding in 1979, "I woke up that night from a blackout to find myself having sex with my own father", and that when she confronted her father months later, asking why he had raped her, her father simply replied, "Raped you? Don't you mean we made love?" Phillips told Oprah Winfrey of having a "consensual" sexual relationship with her father, describing her participation as "sort of Stockholm syndrome, where you begin to love your captor." However, she has also described the initial incident as a rape, and has said, "No matter what kind of incest, it is an abuse of power ... a betrayal of trust."

The incest ended after Phillips became pregnant and subsequently had an abortion for which her father paid.

Geneviève Waïte, John's third wife, denies the allegations, saying they were inconsistent with his character. Michelle Phillips, John's second wife, also stated that she had "every reason to believe [Mackenzie's account is] untrue." However, Chynna Phillips, Mackenzie's half-sister and Michelle Phillips's daughter, stated that she believed Mackenzie's claims and that Mackenzie first told her about the relationship during a phone conversation in 1997, approximately 11 years after the supposed relationship had ended. Jessica Woods, daughter of Denny Doherty, said that her father had told her that he knew "the awful truth" and that he was "horrified at what John had done."

Filmography

Published works
High on Arrival (2009)
Hopeful Healing: Essays on Managing Recovery and Surviving Addiction (2017)

Awards and nominations

References

External links 

1959 births
20th-century American actresses
21st-century American actresses
American child actresses
American film actresses
Actresses from Los Angeles
American memoirists
American women pop singers
American substance abuse counselors
American television actresses
Living people
Participants in American reality television series
Actresses from Alexandria, Virginia
Singers from Los Angeles
Waldorf school alumni
Musicians from Alexandria, Virginia
Incestual abuse
American women memoirists
The Mamas and the Papas members
Phillips family
LGBT people from California
American LGBT musicians
American LGBT writers
LGBT actresses